Kendal Black Drop was a drug based on opium.  Named after Kendal on the edge of the Lake District, England, it is associated with the romantic poet, Samuel Taylor Coleridge.

Description
Black Drop was a 19th-century dark medicine made of opium, vinegar, spices, often with sugar, sometimes called Black drops, and known in Great Britain and North America.

One recipe for Black Drop began, "Macerate the opium and nutmeg in... the diluted acetic acid, for seven days, stirring frequently".

As well as Kendal Black Drop, there were versions called Lancaster and Armstrong's Black Drop.  Other names given in a 19th-century Cyclopædia of Several Thousand Practical Receipts were Quaker's or Toustall's Black Drop, after a Dr. Toustall of the Society of Friends in County Durham who is said to have invented the recipe.

In 1823, Byron referred to it in his poem Don Juan:

At first Coleridge welcomed the relief from pain provided by Kendal Black Drop, but was later to say that his "eyes had been opened to the true nature of the habit into which I had been ignorantly deluded by the seeming magic effects of opium".

References

External links 
 Gillian R. Hamilton, BA and Thomas F. Baskett, MB FRCSC,  In the arms of Morpheus: the development of morphine for postoperative pain relief
 1911 recipe for Black Drop
 1898 recipe for Black Drop
 Coleridge and Kendal Black Drop

History of pharmacy
Opiates